MDMB-CHMICA is an indole-based synthetic cannabinoid that is a potent agonist of the CB1 receptor and has been sold online as a designer drug. While MDMB-CHMICA was initially sold under the name "MMB-CHMINACA", the compound corresponding to this code name (i.e. the isopropyl instead of t-butyl analogue of MDMB-CHMINACA) has been identified on the designer drug market in 2015 as AMB-CHMINACA.

Chemistry 
Several commercial samples of MDMB-CHMICA were found to exclusively contain the (S)-enantiomer based on vibrational and electronic circular dichroism spectroscopy and X-ray crystallography. An (S)-configuration for the tert-leucinate group is unsurprising since MDMB-CHMICA is likely synthesized from the abundant and inexpensive "L" form of the appropriate tert-leucinate reactant.

Pharmacology 

MDMB-CHMICA acts as a highly potent full agonist of the CB1 receptor with an efficacy of 94% and an EC50 value of 0.14 nM, which is  approximately 8 times lower than the EC50 of JWH-018 (1.13 nM) and twofold lower than AB-CHMINACA (0.27 nM).

Metabolism 
MDMB-CHMICA's main metabolic reactions comprise mono-hydroxylations and hydrolysis of the carboxylic ester function. In total, 31 metabolites could be identified in vivo.

Side effects 
Seventy-one serious adverse events, including 42 acute intoxications and 29 deaths (Germany (5), Hungary (3), Poland (1), Sweden (9), United Kingdom (10), Norway (1)) that occurred in nine European countries between 2014 and 2016 have been associated with MDMB-CHMICA.

Side effects such as unconsciousness or coma, hyperemesis, nausea, seizures, convulsions, tachycardia, bradycardia, mydriasis, syncope, spontaneous urinating and defecating, shortness of breath, somnolence, respiratory acidosis, metabolic acidosis, collapse, lower limbs paralysis, chest pain, aggression and severe disturbance of behaviour were reported.

Legal status 

In the United States, MDMB-CHMICA is a Schedule I controlled substance.

MDMB-CHMICA is illegal in Austria, Canada, China, Croatia, Denmark, Estonia, Finland, Germany, Greece, Hungary, Latvia, Lithuania, Louisiana, Luxembourg, Norway, Portugal, Turkey, the UK, Sweden and Switzerland.

In August 2016 the European Commission proposed a ban on MDMB-CHMICA across the European Union.

In 27 February 2017 the Commission adopted an implementing act in banning MDMB-CHMICA, and Member States shall take the necessary measures to subject it to control measures and criminal penalties no later than by 4 March 2018.

Seizures 

Over 3600 MDMB-CHMICA seizures between 2014 and 2016 in 19 member states of the European Union have been reported to the European Monitoring Centre for Drugs and Drug Addiction (EMCDDA), including a 40 kg seizure [sic] in Luxembourg in December 2014.

See also 

 AB-CHMINACA
 ADB-CHMINACA
 AMB-CHMINACA
 MDMB-CHMINACA
 MDMB-FUBINACA
 PX-3

References 

Indoles
Cannabinoids
Designer drugs
Indolecarboxamides